Adam Pearson (born 6 January 1985) is a British actor, presenter and campaigner. He appeared in the 2013 film Under the Skin. He has neurofibromatosis and has been involved in outreach programmes to prevent bullying associated with deformities.

Early life

Adam Pearson was born on 6 January 1985, along with his identical twin brother, Neil. After he hit his head at the age of five, the resultant bump persisted instead of healing. He was diagnosed with neurofibromatosis type I, which causes non-cancerous tumours to grow on nerve tissue. Both Neil and his brother Adam have the condition, which manifests very differently between them.

Pearson has been a victim of bullying throughout his life.

Career
Pearson graduated from the University of Brighton with a degree in business management. He worked various jobs in television production for the BBC and Channel 4 including the shows The Undateables and Beauty and the Beast.

In 2013, he was cast alongside Scarlett Johansson in Jonathan Glazer's film Under the Skin. He said that he hoped the role would challenge disfigurement stigma. He worked as a researcher for the BBC and Channel 4 before becoming a strand presenter on the first series of Beauty and the Beast: the Ugly Face of Prejudice on Channel 4. He was also one of the development team of Beauty and the Beast and consulted on the Dutch version of the series.

Pearson has worked on all five series of The Undateables for Channel 4 as the casting researcher. He has presented the BBC Three documentaries, Adam Pearson: Freak Show and The Ugly Face of Disability Hate Crime, and appeared as a reporter in the Channel 4 series, Tricks of the Restaurant Trade.

Pearson was nominated as UK Documentary Presenter of the Year at the 2016 Grierson Awards.

Adam Pearson is a regular caller and occasional guest host to The Bedtime Babble On, a radio programme that airs on Spark Sunderland, weeknights from 10pm.

In August 2022, Pearson appeared on Celebrity Masterchef, becoming the first contestant to be eliminated in his heat.

Personal Life
Pearson is a Christian. In September 2020 he spoke to Sally Philips, about reconciling his faith with his disability, in an episode of Sunday Morning Live, remarking "a life without hardship is a life without faith; how can you practise your faith if you aren't walking through the fire?"

Filmography

References

External links
 

Living people
English male film actors
1985 births
English people with disabilities
British television presenters
Alumni of the University of Brighton
English twins
Identical twin male actors
Television presenters with disabilities
21st-century English male actors
English Christians